Lady's Island is a predominantly residential Sea Island located in Beaufort County, South Carolina. Small portions of the island are within the City of Beaufort, while the majority of the island remains unincorporated. The South Carolina Highway 802, also known locally as Sams Point Road, serves as the principal highway for Lady's Island and provides the only access to Coosaw Island.

History
The Coosaw band of Native Americans lived in the high ground of Coosaw Point on Lady's Island. Decorative pottery shards and oyster shells are part of the history of where they prepared the oysters gathered from the Coosaw river. Lady's Island was named in 1698, in honor of Lady Elizabeth Axtell Blake, wife of Joseph Blake, governor of colonial South Carolina. She and her mother, Lady Rebecca Axtell, owned Newington Plantation in present-day Summerville, South Carolina. The island is sometimes called Combachee, Combee, or Comber Island for the ACE Basin river that flows along its border.

During the American Civil War, Union forces occupied the islands under the direction of General T. W. Sherman. All of the plantations gave way to military occupation. the major post on Lady's Idland was "Coosaw" or "Sams' fort on the northeaster point of the Island. At this time there were about 30 plantations on the Ladys' Island.

The island was predominantly rural and agricultural in character for much of its history. In 1927, the first bridge connected downtown Beaufort with Lady's Island. As development of Beaufort and surrounding areas began in the last half of the 20th century, the island began to develop former plantation and timber tracts into residential subdivisions. A second bridge connected Ladys Island with Port Royal in the 1980s.

The Laurel Hill Plantation, once owned by Girard B. Henderson, was on Sam’s Point Road on Lady’s Island. It consisted of approximately 368 acres of land. Truck Farming for the production of fruits, vegetables and flowers as cash crops was done on the plantation. The land had a small grass air field (once called Laurel Hill Plantation Airport), residences, and an assortment of non-historic buildings and mobile homes. Laurel Hill Plantation was sold in 1997 to Homestake Realty Company and is now called Coosaw Point.

Economy 
The island is home to four public schools (two elementary, one middle, and one high school), Beaufort Academy, a K-12 private school, and  Saint Peter's Catholic School, a K3-6 private Catholic school. Commercial development clustered at the intersection of S.C. Highway 802 and U.S. Highway 21 serves Lady's Island, Beaufort, and the surrounding Sea Islands of northern Beaufort County. The island is also the location of the Beaufort County Airport. Faith Communities located on the island include First Scots Presbyterian Church of Beaufort, St. John's Lutheran Church, Sea Island Presbyterian Church, St. Peter's Catholic Church, Meadowbrook Baptist Church, Unitarian Universalist Fellowship of Beaufort, Israelite Baptist Church, Grace Chapel AME Church, Lady's Island Baptist Church, Water's Edge New United Methodist Church, and Tidal Creek Fellowship.

Ecosystems
Lady's Isalnd has three ecosystems: the maritime ecosystem of upland forest area, the estuarine ecosystem of deep water didal habitats, and the palustrine ecosystem of fresh water wetlands.

Notable people
 Lady Elizabeth Axtell Blake, Ladys Island was named in honor of her
 Joseph Blake, governor of colonial South Carolina
 Girard B. Henderson, American business executive and philanthropist; lived on Ladys Island

References

External links

 Ladys Island, Beaufort SC lady's Island SC form the air.
 FaceBook page Ladys Island, SC

Towns in Beaufort County, South Carolina
Islands of Beaufort County, South Carolina
Islands of South Carolina
Hilton Head Island–Beaufort micropolitan area
South Carolina Sea Islands